The King of Fighters '94 (KOF 94) is a fighting game released by SNK for the Neo Geo-based arcade system in 1994, as the first in The King of Fighters series. The game was also released for the Neo Geo home console systems, including a Neo Geo CD version. In 2008, KOF 94 was one of sixteen games included in SNK Arcade Classics Vol. 1 for the PlayStation 2, PlayStation Portable and Wii.

KOF '94 is a crossover featuring characters from SNK's fighting game properties Fatal Fury and Art of Fighting. It also includes revised versions of characters from their pre-Neo Geo games Ikari Warriors and Psycho Soldier, as well as original characters created specifically for the game. The plot features the creation of a new King of Fighters tournament created by the criminal Rugal Bernstein and is the only game to take place during the pre-Orochi Saga of the series.

SNK developed KOF '94 with the initial idea of using several games from the company in order to attract gamers who played these games. The characters' designs, as well as its innovative gameplay system based on using teams of three members, were both well received. The success of the game allowed SNK to produce a series of sequels in The King of Fighters series and the series itself eventually became the flagship series of SNK.

In 2004, to commemorate the tenth anniversary of the series, SNK released a remake titled The King of Fighters '94 Re-Bout. It features the original game and a new version with higher resolution graphics and 3D environments.

Gameplay

The basic gameplay system of KOF '94 is similar to SNK's previous games like the Fatal Fury series, Art of Fighting and Samurai Shodown. The game uses a four attack button configuration similar to Fatal Fury 2 and Fatal Fury Special, that consists of light punch, light kick, strong punch and strong kick. Like in Fatal Fury 2, specialized techniques are performed by pressing combinations of buttons, allowing the player to dodge an opponent's attack or to launch a character's powerful knockdown attack. As with most other fighting games, each character has a set of basic, unique, and special moves that can be performed by the player with a specific series of joystick and button inputs.

Each player has a power gauge at the bottom of the screen which charges when the character is blocking or taking attacks. It can also be filled manually, although it leaves the character vulnerable to an attack, by pressing and holding three buttons at the same time. Once the power gauge is filled, the players basic attacks become stronger for a short period. When the characters are in this state, their players can also perform the character's Super Move, which immediately consumes the entire power gauge. The players can also access their character's Super Move when the life gauge is 75% empty and flashing red like in Fatal Fury 2. Taunting an opponent can reduce their power gauge, slow down their manual charging, and stop them from reaching the maximum level.

KOF 94 innovated the genre by replacing a traditional round-based format used in preceding fighting games with a format consisting of 3-on-3 team-based matches dubbed the Team Battle System. Instead of choosing a single character, the player selects from one of eight available teams, each consisting of three members. Before each match, the player chooses the order in which their team members enter the battle. When the match begins, the members chosen to go first on their respective teams will fight. When one character is defeated, the following member of the same team will take his or her place, while the character on the other team will have a small portion of their life restored (if energy was lost during the previous round). If a character is losing a match against the opponent, then the player can call one of the remaining teammates standing on the sidelines to jump in and perform a support attack. The match ends when all three members of either team lose.

Plot

Rugal Bernstein, a notorious and ruthless but skilled and influential black market weapons and drugs dealer bored of the lack of competition, he decides to host a new King of Fighters tournament after the previous K.O.F. announcements. Rugal sent out 24 invitations to certain individuals around the world. Unlike the previous three K.O.F. tournaments depicted in Art of Fighting 2, Fatal Fury: King of Fighters, and Fatal Fury 2; the new King of Fighters is a team tournament, with eight teams of three, each representing a different nationality.

At the tournament's conclusion, Mature, Rugal's personal secretary, invited the Japan team to fight their final match within Black Noah. It is there when Rugal revealed the true purpose of his tournament: defeat the winning team and add them to his grisly collection of previous challengers who were turned into statues. Kyo sees his defeated father there and decides to avenge him. As Rugal is finally beaten, he triggers the self-destruct mechanism on his ship. The team escapes and reflects on their victory.

Characters

The game has 24 playable characters, consisting of eight teams of three fighters. The final boss is not a part of any of the teams, is unplayable and fights the player's team alone. Five teams consist of characters from other SNK series while the rest consist mostly of KoF originals. Each team represents a different country, though this only affects the stage on which the team is fought and the characters in many cases don't share nationalities with the country they represent. Unlike later games in the series, the player cannot freely build a team and must choose one of the eight preset teams. Teams include:

 Team Japan (Team Hero):
  Kyo Kusanagi, a highschool student whose family possesses an ancient pyrokinetic abilities. He fights using Kenpo.
  Benimaru Nikaido, a model who fights with shootboxing and also has electrokinetic abilities.
  Goro Daimon, a large judoka who has geokinetic abilities.

 Team Fatal Fury:
  Terry Bogard, protagonist of the Fatal Fury series who has been trained in various fighting styles such as Karate, Kickboxing and Kung Fu. He can also attack with ki-based techniques he learned from his master, Tung Fu Rue.
  Andy Bogard, brother of Terry, who is trained in Koppojutsu and Shiranui-Ryu Ninjutsu. He also has ki-based techniques he learned from Tung Fu Rue.
  Joe Higashi, a Muay Thai fighter with aerokinetic abilities.

 Team Art of Fighting:
  Ryo Sakazaki, protagonist of the Art of Fighting series and the first champion of KoF tournament who practices Kyokugenryu Karate, which is similar to Kyokushin Karate but also contains ki-based techniques. He fights with a traditional version of Kyokugenryu.
  Robert Garcia, Ryo's best friend and friendly rival who fights using a kick-heavy version of Kyokugenryu Karate.
  Takuma Sakazaki, Ryo's father and a master of Kyokugenryu Karate, the only one who can perform the most advanced techniques of the style.

 Team Women Fighters:
  Mai Shiranui, a kunoichi who practices her family's own martial art, Shiranui-Ryu Ninjutsu.
  Yuri Sakazaki, younger sister of Ryo, who fights with an unorthodox take on Kyokugenryu Karate.
  King, a bar owner who fights with her own kick-heavy take on Muay Thai. Can also throw ki-based attacks with her kicks.

 Team Ikari Warriors:
  Ralf Jones, protagonist of the Ikari Warriors series. A mercenary whose fighting style is based on hard punches.
  Clark Still, Ralf's best friend and the other protagonist of the Ikari Warriors series. He fights with a wrestling-based fighting style.
  Heidern, the commander of the Ikari Warriors mercenary unit whose hands can cut like knives and he can also throw slashes as projectiles.

 Team Korea Justice:
  Kim Kaphwan, a Taekwondo-master with a strong sense of justice who is trying to rehabilitate the two criminals in his team.
  Chang Koehan, A very large criminal who fights with a large metal ball attached to a chain.
  Choi Bounge A very small criminal who fights with Freddy Krueger-esque claws.

 Team Psycho Soldier:
  Athena Asamiya, the protagonist of Psycho Soldier and an idol with psychokinetic abilities and Kung Fu training, though her fighting style emphasizes the former.
  Sie Kensou, the self-proclaimed love interest of Athena. He has the same psychokinetic abilities as Athena, though his fighting style emphasizes his Kung Fu.
  Chin Gentsai, master of Athena and Sie and a master of various styles of Kung Fu, though he fights primarily with Drunken Boxing.

 Team American Sports:
 Heavy D!, a professional boxer who was banned from regular competition after severely injuring his opponent.
 Lucky Glauber, a former professional basketball player and a Karate champion with a penchant for street fighting.
 Brian Battler, an American football player who also makes use of wrestling.

Final Boss:
 Rugal Bernstein An arms dealer and the organizer of The King of Fighters tournament. He is capable of copying any technique after seeing it performed once and he makes heavy use of Geese Howard's Reppuuken (which would later also used by Geese's biological son and Kain R. Heinlein's nephew Rock Howard along with Rugal's son Adelheid Bernstein) and Wolfgang Krauser's Kaiser Wave ki-attacks. He also has techniques of his own, such as a slashing kick named Genocide Cutter.

Development
According to an interview with veteran designers of The King of Fighters series, the prototype version of the game was a Double Dragon-style side-scrolling beat 'em up, titled Survivor. It would only use core characters from the Art of Fighting and Fatal Fury series, specifically allowing players to play Robert Garcia and Terry Bogard for location testing. However, the idea was eventually abandoned. Since SNK were attached to the idea of the two-series crossover, they eventually agreed to make their idea into a fighting game. Characters from Ikari Warriors and Psycho Soldier were also added to the roster. The concept of a three-man team was one of the ideas kept from the side-scrolling version. The title "The King of Fighters" was re-used from the subtitle of the first Fatal Fury game, Fatal Fury: King of Fighters.

The King of Fighters series director Toyohisa Tanabe asserted that the Art of Fighting and Fatal Fury fighters were added specifically for adults, and the newer KOF characters were aimed to appeal to younger and newer audiences. Characters such as Benimaru Nikaido and Chang Koehan were added to have an off-beat variety to the cast, which he has previously deemed to be too serious. SNK artist C.A.C Yamasaki commented that although the lead programmer thought the game would not sell well, he believed it would eventually become popular. Ten people arrived at the first location test, but larger numbers came to subsequent tests. The SNK staff also had troubles with advertising the game due to a lack of money and some of their ads were noted to be of a poor quality.

Designers wanted a new, "snazzy" lead character who would easily fight Fatal Fury and Art of Fighting characters. He was named Kyo Kusanagi in order to relate him with the Yamata no Orochi legend. The boss character, Rugal Bernstein, was developed to be "the mightiest (most violent) and most evil boss character ever". The game was developed to have a "Fugitive Team" composed of Chang, Choi, and an unknown criminal, but Kim Kaphwan was placed in their team. The English Team was composed of King from Art of Fighting along with Billy Kane and Big Bear from the first and second Fatal Fury games. Designers had several problems with Big Bear concerning capacity and the Art of Fighting staff insisted on adding Yuri Sakazaki to KOF. Yuri replaced Billy Kane, and later Mai Shiranui took Big Bear's place to form the England Team (later known as Women Fighters in the following games).

Most of the characters from other games were meant to have some of their moves changed or removed in order to balance them with KOF's new characters. However, designers focused on adjusting the imbalance of certain characters without removing any move. In the end, creators of the series noted that the Art of Fighting characters were the strongest ones in the game. Nevertheless, other characters such as Terry and Andy Bogard became the ones who got the designers' utmost attention and were given new moves.

Release

Neo Geo systems
The King of Fighters '94 was released in Japanese arcades on August 25, 1994. Home versions of the game were released later that same year for the Neo Geo ROM cartridge based system on October 1 and for the Neo Geo CD on November 2. The home version was censored outside Japan in two ways, removing Mai's breasts bouncing animations and blood effects (the blood also could have been disabled by arcade operators). In 2012, KOF '94 was announced to be included in the set of twenty pre-loaded games being shipped with SNK Playmore's new handheld game console Neo-Geo X, but it was ultimately replaced by The King of Fighters '95.

Emulations
On November 6, 2007, the Neo Geo version was made available for download on the Wii's Virtual Console download service, for a price of 900 Wii Points. The North American and European versions followed on November 23, 2007 and January 7, 2008, respectively. An emulation of the game is included in the compilations SNK Arcade Classics Vol. 1 and The King of Fighters Collection: The Orochi Saga, both released for the PlayStation 2, PlayStation Portable and Wii. It was also released by Sony Computer Entertainment for the PlayStation 3 and PlayStation Portable on December 21, 2010, as one of the first games in the NEOGEO Station line-up.

Remake

A remake, titled The King of Fighters '94 Re-Bout, was released for the PlayStation 2 in Japan only on December 28, 2004, commemorating the tenth anniversary of the franchise. Re-Bout features the original 1994 game and an enhanced version featuring  higher resolution graphics, a Team Edit option feature similar to the later KOF games, the ability to play as Saisyu Kusanagi and Rugal Bernstein, arranged music, new stages and an online versus mode. SNK Playmore commented that they received negative fan feedback regarding the game's simple upscaling and smoothing of character sprites, so they decided to create brand new high resolution sprites for the following games in the series.

A North American version was meant to be released for the Xbox. It was completed and even reviewed by some publications, but was canceled on March 23, 2006 for an undisclosed reason. In Japan, the game sold 28,482 units.

Related media
The game received a variety of licensed media released in Japan in 1994–1995:
The original soundtrack The King of Fighters '94 (PCCB-00162) and the arranged soundtrack The King of Fighters '94 Arrange Sound Trax (PCCB-00165), both released by Pony Canyon.
The art book The King of Fighters '94 (GMC-2) published as part of the Gamest Mook series by Shinseisha.
The Laser Disc audio and video release The King of Fighters '94 (PCLP-00539) by Pony Canyon LD.
Several manga published in the Gamest Comics collection by Shinseisha:
A yonkoma manga by various artists, titled The King of Fighters '94 4-Koma Ketteiban.
A selection of illustrations and short strips by various artists, titled The King of Fighters '94 Comic Anthology.
Ryo Takamisaki's six-volume adaptation series titled The King of Fighters '94 Gaiden (beginning with ).

Reception

In Japan, Game Machine listed The King of Fighters '94 on their October 1, 1994 issue as being the second most popular arcade game at the time. In North America, RePlay reported King of Fighters '94 to be the third most-popular arcade game at the time. Play Meter also listed the title to be the thirty-second most-popular arcade game at the time. The game was well received, with reviews generally praising the deep combat system and the matching up of fighters from different SNK franchises, though the inability to choose team lineups in Team Battle Mode was a near-universal complaint among critics.

A reviewer for Next Generation argued that King of Fighters '94 was a particularly worthwhile arcade game, since the three-character teams meant the player would effectively get three lives for each credit, providing a high value per quarter at a time when most arcade games were much more expensive than they had been in the past. Reviewing the Neo Geo home version, GamePro remarked that the character selection is massive, but very unbalanced, and that most of the new characters are "goofy looking" and underpowered compared to the other fighters. They nonetheless concluded that "The King of Fighters is the very best non-Shodown game available for the Neo Geo, and it's one of the most playable fighting games ever", citing enjoyable gameplay additions such as the dodge move and juggle combos.

In a review of the Virtual Console release, Lucas M. Thomas of IGN praised KOF '94 for its graphics, including fluid animation and vibrant colors, but concluded that buyers might be better off waiting for the improved sequels to arrive on the Virtual Console. According to IGN's Jeremy Dunham, the game "was essentially a cross between Fatal Fury and Art of Fighting," with a faster control response. He added commented that the creation of three-on-three battles was an advanced feature for a game from 1994 and the idea of 'borrowing' characters from other games from the company was also innovative. Reviewing the Virtual Console release, Dan Whitehead of Eurogamer identified the use of characters from multiple franchises and the Team Battle Mode as the most distinctive points. He concluded the game to be "a solid, technical fighting game that, like most SNK outings, skews more towards the hardcore player than the casual punching aficionado." According to Kyle Knight of Allgame, the graphics and sounds, while better than most games of the time, were subpar by SNK standards. He concluded The King of Fighters '94 is "a very good fighting game, but it lacks some refinements that would have made it great."

Electronic Gaming Monthly gave KOF '94 its Game of the Year awards in the categories "Best Fighting Game" and "Best Neo-Geo Game" of 1994; additionally, Mai Shiranui was awarded the title of "Hottest Game Babe" of the year. In Japan, the game was awarded the title of "Best Game of 1994" in the Eighth Annual Grand Prize by the arcade magazine Gamest, also placing first in the categories of "Best Competitive Fighting Game" and "Best Direction", fifth in "Best Graphics", and third in "Best VGM" (several characters from the game were also featured in their list of 1994's top 50, including Athena at #3, Kyo at #4, Yuri at #7, King at #8 and Mai at #10).

The game was acclaimed in a number of retrospective articles and top lists by several publications. G4 noted that The King of Fighters '94 was regarded by some fans as the "Street Fighter beater" and was unique due to its team system. Maximum similarly called it "the first beat-em-up to offer more than the Street Fighter series" and said that the game "helped spearhead the SNK renaissance". 1UP.com lauded the game for its large and well-balanced cast of characters, calling it "a hell of a cast in 1994". In 2010, UGO.com listed it among the Top 25 Fighting Games of All Time, while GamePlayBook ranked it as the seventh best 2D fighting game ever made. Complex writers ranked it as the eighth best fighting game of all time in 2011, as well as the eleventh all-time best SNK fighting game in 2012, commenting that "the unique team selection and elimination style matches of the series made their origin in this great '90s fighter." 

Next Generation reviewed the Neo-Geo version of the game, and stated that "Every fighting fan should take a look at this one either in the arcades or in the home."

References

External links
 Entry on The King of Fighters 10th anniversary official website
 The King of Fighters '94: Re-bout official website 
  The King of Fighters '94 Virtual Console edition official website 
 
 
 

1994 video games
2D fighting games
ACA Neo Geo games
Arcade video games
Neo Geo games
Cancelled Xbox games
Censored video games
Neo Geo CD games
Nintendo Switch games
PlayStation 2 games
PlayStation 4 games
PlayStation Network games
SNK games
SNK Playmore games
The King of Fighters games
Video games scored by Masahiko Hataya
Video games set in China
Video games set in Brazil
Video games set in England
Video games set in Italy
Video games set in Japan
Video games set in Korea
Video games set in Mexico
Video games set in the United States
Virtual Console games
Xbox One games
D4 Enterprise games
Video games developed in Japan
Hamster Corporation games